Corday is a surname. Notable people with the surname include:

 Betty Corday (1912–1987), American soap opera producer, wife of Ted Corday
 Charlotte Corday (1768–1793), assassin of Jean-Paul Marat
 Christine Corday (born 1970), American artist
 Jennifer Corday (born 1966), singer
 Mara Corday (born 1930), actress and Playboy playmate
 Ted Corday (1908–1966), American soap opera producer, husband of Betty Corday

Fictional characters
 Elizabeth Corday, a character in the television series ER

See also
 Corday Productions, an American production company